Iryna Romanivna Mudra (born ) is a Ukrainian lawyer and banker who has been serving as one of the several Deputy Ministers of Justice under Prime Minister Denys Shmyhal since 27 May 2022. A graduate of the University of Lviv, she was a lawyer at the State Savings Bank of Ukraine before she began working for the state.

In the international arena, she is known for publicly promoting the development of a mechanism for sanctions and reparations against the Russian Federation for the war against Ukraine.

Early life and education 
Iryna Mudra was born on July 26, 1975 in Drohobych, Lviv region.

 In 1998 she graduated from Ivan Franko Pedagogical Institute at the Faculty of Foreign Languages with honors.
 From 2002 — 2006 she studied on Faculty of Law of Ivan Franko Lviv National University.
 In 2017 Iryna completed a particular course for lawyers in Legal English at the University of Cambridge.
 In 2017 — 2018 Mudra completed an MBA course at the Kyiv School of Economics.
 2019 — 2020 — internship at the International Compliance Association (London). Certificate "Corporate management, risks, and compliance."

Career 
 2006 – 2008 — head of the department of credit and investment activities of the legal department of Transbank.
 2008 - 2013 — Swedbank.
 2013 – 2015 — head of the legal department of risk management of Pravex Bank.
 2015 - 2022 head of the legal team of the Oschadbank.

Deputy Minister of Justice of Ukraine 
On May 20, 2022, by Order No. 394 of the Cabinet of Ministers of Ukraine, Iryna Mudra was appointed Deputy Minister of Justice of Ukraine.

The cash crunch has concentrated Ukrainian officials’ gaze on Russia's sanctioned oligarchs. The government has been working the diplomatic channels since the beginning of June to build political momentum for an accord to make the Russians pay, Deputy Minister of Justice Iryna Mudra 5 July said in an interview from Kyiv. "Of course, we are very thankful to our allies for stepping up with financial help," she said. "But we do have to admit that it should be the Russians who should pay for all these damages." However, there's no readymade legal structure that would allow for seizing frozen Russian assets and sending them to Ukraine, she said, especially since Russia could veto anything at the U.N. level from its perch on the Security Council. So instead, the Ukrainian government is aiming to get, at the very least, the global community’s “blessing” at the U.N. General Assembly in September, Mudra said. In addition to Russian assets, Kyiv would also like to see a special tax on transactions with Russia.

July 7, she stated that the project to digitize the justice system had been postponed for several years. But now, it’s time to move as fast as possible, thanks to the roadmap for EU accession.

On the timing of the reconstruction, Mudra states that the war is still ongoing. Still, the important thing is to have a clear and transparent process, which is why they must create a legal context in advance to confiscate the Russian assets.

In August, Mudra said trials could not be held for Ukrainian prisoners of war.

At the same time, she that Ukraine records the crimes committed by Russian Federation and uses available international legal opportunities to ensure the rights of Ukrainian defenders held captive by the Russian occupiers.

In September, the media wrote about her: "But even that is no easy task. Ukraine’s deputy justice minister, Iryna Mudra, this month is touring capitals in Europe and the U.S. to convince governments to track down assets of sanctioned Russians — and confiscate them... Mudra also wants the EU to confiscate Russian state assets, not just private ones, to use for the reconstruction of Ukraine. That plan, however, faces legal hurdles and is unlikely to become reality any time soon — which Mudra acknowledges."

Iryna Mudra stated in September that her country has no prospects of receiving reparations from Russia in international courts. She explained that Russia had withdrawn from the Council of Europe and had agreed not to implement the decisions issued by the European Court of Human Rights after March 15. According to the Ukrainian politician, the Russian funds confiscated so far will not be enough to rebuild Ukraine.

On September 2022, German politician Günter Krings wrote: "Yesterday I was able to exchange views with the Ukrainian Minister of Justice, Denys Maliuska, his deputy Iryna Mudra and other colleagues from the Kyiv government, together with colleagues from the legal committee of our Bundestag. Ukrainian officials have demanded that oligarchs' assets be frozen and confiscated for future reparations claims. Natural and legal persons in Ukraine should receive compensation for it. Compensation should also be paid for environmental damage. Establishing a compensation fund and a register of all damages was suggested. Even before the summer break, we, as the Union, had called for the sanctions against oligarchs to be improved and will be happy to take up this topic and follow it closely."

Later she attended the UK: "Ukraine’s deputy justice minister, Iryna Mudra, was in London last week to discuss the issue with the Foreign Office after lobbying the Council of Europe’s council of ministers in Strasbourg alongside Olena Zelenska, the wife of the Ukrainian president, Volodymyr Zelenskiy. A former banker, Mudra has been at the helm of the detailed legal and political discussions on reparations, holding talks in Germany, Paris, and Brussels and with the US treasury assistant secretary, Elizabeth Rosenberg."

Awards 
2018 - Best Legal Adviser in Banking and Financial Law at the "50 Leading Legal Departments of Ukraine" awards ceremony.

Personal life 
She has two children.

Notes

References

External links 
 Register of damages from Russian aggression will appear in Ukraine next year
 Ирина Мудрая: Рассмотрение дел против России в ЕСПЧ может растянуться до 10 лет
 A New Marshall Plan? How Ukraine Will Be Rebuilt
 How realistic are Russian reparation payments to Ukraine?
 A German Company's Questionable Involvement in Russia

1975 births
Living people
21st-century Ukrainian women politicians
Women government ministers of Ukraine